Keep It Comin' is the title of a number-one R&B single by singer Keith Sweat. from his third studio album of the same name, the song was a moderate success on the Billboard Hot 100 peaking at #17, and also spent two weeks at number-one on the US R&B chart.

The song features a sample of Kool and the Gang's 1973 hit "Jungle Boogie".

Track listing

 12" single #1
A1. "Keep It Comin'" (12" Mix) (5:47)
A2. "Keep It Comin'" (Hip Hop Mix With Rap) (3:56)
A3. "Keep It Comin'" (Radio Mix) (4:09)
B1. "Keep It Comin'" (Smooth Mix) (5:21)
B2. "Keep It Comin'" (Hip Hop Mix Without Rap) (3:56)

 12" single #2
A1. "Keep It Comin'" (Funky House Mix)*
A2. "Keep It Comin'" (Gangster Mix)*
A3. "Keep It Comin'" (Hip Hop Mix With Rap)
A4. "Keep It Comin'" (Background Dub)*
B1. "Keep It Comin'" (Twelve Inch Mix)
B2. "Keep It Comin'" (Smooth Mix)
B3. "Keep It Comin'" (Masters At Work Dub)*

* remixed by Masters at Work.

Charts

Weekly charts

Year-end charts

See also
List of number-one R&B singles of 1992 (U.S.)

Notes and references

1991 singles
Keith Sweat songs
Songs written by Lionel Job
1991 songs
Elektra Records singles